Rock Until You Drop is the first full-length album by British heavy metal band Raven, released in 1981. The album was the first of many heavy metal studio albums issued by British independent label Neat Records. It reached position No. 63 in the UK Albums Chart.

The song "Lambs to the Slaughter" was covered by German thrash metal band Kreator on their Out of the Dark... Into the Light EP, added to the re-mastered Terrible Certainty CD in 2000.

Track listing
All songs written by Gallagher, Gallagher and Hunter, except where noted.

Personnel

Raven 
John Gallagher – lead vocals, bass, classical guitar
Mark Gallagher – electric guitar, backing vocals
Rob Hunter – drums, backing vocals

Production 
Steve Thompson – producer
Mickey Sweeney – engineer

References

1981 debut albums
Raven (British band) albums